Radio Victory was the independent local radio (ILR) station for Portsmouth in southern England. It was launched on 14 October 1975 and served south Hampshire, West Sussex and the Isle of Wight initially until 1986, with various later reincarnations. It took its name from the famous historic ship HMS Victory which is preserved at Portsmouth.

History

IBA franchise 1975-1986
Victory was one of the first 19 independent stations in the UK, all of which started broadcasting between 1973 and 1976.
Its studios were based in Fratton, Portsmouth. Its FM transmitter, on 95.0 MHz, was at Fort Widley. Despite a power of only 0.2 kW, the signal reached Southampton and across the Isle of Wight quite well. The station also broadcast on Medium Wave 257m (1169 kHz, later moving to 1170 kHz) from Farlington Marshes with a power of 0.2 kW.

Victory had three managing directors throughout its life – Guy Paine, John Russell, and finally Bruce Jenkins. Housed in St Mary's Institute in Portsmouth's Fratton Road, its address was PO Box 257, Portsmouth PO1 5RT.

For most of its life, Victory transmitted from 6 am to 1 am Mondays–Fridays, 6 am to 2 am Saturdays and 7 am to midnight on Sundays. This increased to 24-hour broadcasting from the start of the Falklands Conflict. Newsreader Penny Guy broadcast news of the first UK warship casualty—the sinking of HMS Sheffield. Listeners were unaware her fiancé Derek was aboard the vessel and she had no idea if he was alive or dead. (He survived and they wed shortly afterwards.)

In 1985, the Independent Broadcasting Authority failed to renew the station's licence and it ceased broadcasting on 28 June 1986 at 12 pm, after 10 years and around 257 days on air, despite a local campaign to save it. Fratton Road in Portsmouth was jammed solid with traffic, drivers blaring their horns in tribute as the airwaves fell silent for the last time. Victory was the first ILR station to lose its franchise (although two others, Centre Radio and Gwent Broadcasting, went off air after going bankrupt).

The station was replaced by Ocean Sound which was given a licence for a larger coverage area including Southampton.

Victory FM and Radio Victory 1994-1999
The name Victory, as a radio station for the Portsmouth area, was re-invented in 1994 to mark the city's 800th birthday and the 50th anniversary of D-Day (the city was the world's focus for this, hosting many events, including a dinner for world leaders in the Guildhall). Victory FM was set up by Mark Samways with the help of Kevin Huffer. Alex Bentley, the city's Lord Mayor during the set-up period, was most encouraging and helped by arranging for the council to provide space for the studios in the civic offices for a peppercorn rent. This first outing for the new service acquired a 28-day broadcast licence, called Restricted Service Licence (RSL), from the Radio Authority.

It returned to the air twice more as Victory FM – over the Christmas period of 1994 and again in 1995 to mark VE Day's 50th anniversary. The studios for this period were located in the Anchor House, North End and were loaned by the owners the Bradford and Bingley Building Society. The building had been empty since the Hampshire Building Society closed for business.

The name was kept alive by predominantly the same team, broadcasting from a studios in Twyford Avenue, Stamshaw, this time broadcasting as Radio Victory on cable TV and with occasional temporary FM licences for special occasions, such as their own launch on cable at Christmas 1995 and to cover the Special Olympics. A total of six 28-day RSL FM broadcasts were made from 1994 to 1998.

Victory FM, Victory 107.4 and 107.4 The Quay 1999 - 2010 
When Greater Portsmouth was re-issued with its own ILR franchise, Radio Victory won the bid. It returned to the airwaves on 19 September 1999 as Victory FM on 107.4 FM. The station was acquired by TLRC at the end of 1999, and 2000 saw a massive change of personnel. It would seem that, without the key members who took the station from 28-day RSL to full-time FM licence, it was unable to compete in the RAJAR ratings against now established local rivals like Ocean FM and Wave 105. The station later relaunched as Victory 107.4 and 107.4 The Quay, allying itself closely to Portsmouth Football Club (PFC) who from Autumn of 2009 became the sole owners. During 2010 PFC sold the station to Celador's radio arm and the frequency became part of a regional station called The Breeze on 4 July 2010. The local studios in Twyford Avenue used since 1999 were closed.

Registration of trade mark 2014
In November 2014 Independent Local Radio Limited, a company with no previous connection to the name, registered the trademark Radio Victory along with a number of other names of former UK local radio stations.

In early 2015 Independent Local Radio Limited launched crowdfunding bid "to raise £25,000 to cover the cost of licences" to launch Radio Victory again, this campaign closed only having raised £571.

Victory Online 2021
A number of former Radio Victory presenters from the 3 eras of the station launched Victory Online at 13:00 on 18 February 2021, the opening programme was hosted by Neil Crespin.

This service is not connected with the trademark owner, but uses much of the historic station on-air branding.

On Air
One of Victory's longest running shows was the Victory Roll, its own top-40 chart show aired on Saturday evenings until all ILR stations started simulcasting the Network Chart from Capital Radio. The Victory Roll (presented by Tony Power) was initially based on the station's playlist but later was compiled from record sales at the Co-op record department in Fratton Road. The stations's first catchphrase was "everything that touches you". Presenters included Nino Firetto. The initial Victory FM catchphrases were "enjoy the moment", "from the heart of the city", and sometimes "to greater Portsmouth." Broadcasters on the relaunched Radio Victory 107.4 in 1999 included Boy George, who also presented on the cable service.

See also
107.4 The Quay
Ocean FM
BBC Radio Solent

References

External links
Radio Victory Web Archive
Victory Online

Defunct radio stations in the United Kingdom
Organisations based in Portsmouth
Radio stations established in 1975
Radio stations in Hampshire
Radio stations in Sussex
Radio stations in the Isle of Wight